"Sales Pitch" is a science fiction short story by American writer  Philip K. Dick, first published in Future Science Fiction magazine, June 1954. The premise is the omnipresent, intrusive and even aggressive advertising and marketing. At the end of the story, the protagonist is driven mad by a robot who can forcefully market himself, and refuses to take no for an answer. The subject was of concern to Dick, and features in his early works such as The Man Who Japed.

Ending
In 1978, Dick said of the story:

For a 1989–1990  radio series, Sci Fi Radio produced an audio play version of this story    which is now available for free download. The story was adapted by Tony Grisoni for the episode "Crazy Diamond" of the 2017 TV series Philip K. Dick's Electric Dreams.

References

External links

Short stories by Philip K. Dick
1954 short stories
Works originally published in Future Science Fiction and Science Fiction Stories